The 2013 Gerry Weber Open was a men's tennis tournament played on outdoor grass courts. It was the 21st edition of the event known that year as the Gerry Weber Open and was part of the ATP World Tour 250 series of the 2013 ATP World Tour. It took place at the Gerry Weber Stadion in Halle, Germany, between 8 June and 16 June 2013. First-seeded Roger Federer won the singles title.

Singles main-draw entrants

Seeds 

 1 Rankings are as of May 27, 2013.

Other entrants 
The following players received wildcards into the singles main draw:
  Cedrik-Marcel Stebe
  Jan-Lennard Struff
  Mischa Zverev

The following players received entry from the qualifying draw:
  Martin Fischer
  Riccardo Ghedin
  Jan Hernych
  Jimmy Wang

The following player received entry as a lucky loser:
  Mirza Bašić

Withdrawals 
Before the tournament
  Paolo Lorenzi
  Rafael Nadal (fatigue)
  Philipp Petzschner (right shoulder injury)
  Andreas Seppi
  Janko Tipsarević

Doubles main-draw entrants

Seeds 

 Rankings are as of May 27, 2013.

Other entrants 
The following pairs received wildcards into the doubles main draw:
  Daniel Brands /  Tobias Kamke
  Robin Kern /  Jan-Lennard Struff

Withdrawals 
During the tournament
  Philipp Petzschner (right shoulder injury)

Finals

Singles 

 Roger Federer defeated  Mikhail Youzhny, 6–7(5–7), 6–3, 6–4

Doubles 

 Santiago González /  Scott Lipsky defeated  Daniele Bracciali /  Jonathan Erlich, 6–2, 7–6(7–3)

References

External links